The Triple Bend Stakes is a Grade II American Thoroughbred horse race for horses age four years and older over a distance of seven furlongs on the dirt held at Santa Anita Park in Arcadia, California in June. The race currently offers a purse of $200,000.

History

The event was inaugurated on the 10 June 1952 as the Lakes And Flowers Handicap and was won by Intent defeating Admiral Drake with Last Round finishing in third before a crowd of 42,004. In 1956 the event was shortened to 6 furlongs.

The event was increased back to its original distance of 7 furlongs in 1973.

In 1979 the name was changed to Triple Bend Handicap honoring Frank McMahon's colt Triple Bend whose wins included the Santa Anita Handicap and who set a world record time of 1:19.80 for seven furlongs on dirt in winning the 1972 Los Angeles Handicap at Hollywood Park Racetrack. In 1980, Rich Cream broke that mark with another world record time for seven furlongs on dirt in winning the Triple Bend Handicap.

In 1988 the event was upgraded to a Grade III and ten years later to GII. For a period of 16 years the event was a Grade I ending in 2018.

After the closure of Hollywood Park in 2013, the event was moved to Santa Anita Park.

Time To Leave is the only mare to have won the race in 1970.

Records
Speed record:
 7 furlongs – 1:19.40 Rich Cream (1980) (World record)
 6 furlongs – 1:07.80 Time To Leave (1970)

Margins:
  lengths – Robyn Dancer (1991)

Most wins:
 2 – Porterhouse (1955 & 1956)

Most wins by an owner:
 3 - Llangollen Farm Stable (1955, 1956, 1957)

Most wins by a jockey:
 8 – Bill Shoemaker (1953, 1960, 1962, 1963, 1964, 1973, 1979, 1980)

Most wins by a trainer:
 7 – Bob Baffert (1996, 2009, 2010, 2014, 2016, 2020, 2021)

Winners

Legend:

 
 

Notes:

§ Ran as part of an entry

ƒ Filly or Mare

See also
List of American and Canadian Graded races

External links
 Santa Anita Media Guide for 2019 Winter Meet

References

Graded stakes races in the United States
Open mile category horse races
Grade 2 stakes races in the United States
Horse races in the United States
Santa Anita Park
Breeders' Cup Challenge series